Brigadier Duncan Ross Green  (1925–2019) was an officer of the British and Indian armies, who led Gurkhas against the Indonesian incursion into Malaysia.

References

1925 births
2019 deaths
People educated at the Royal Grammar School Worcester
Royal Gurkha Rifles officers
Recipients of the Military Cross
Commanders of the Order of the British Empire
British Indian Army officers
Indian Army personnel of World War II
British Army personnel of the Indonesia–Malaysia confrontation
British Army brigadiers